Gravipalpus is a genus of South American dwarf spiders that was first described by Alfred Frank Millidge in 1991.  it contains only three species, found in Argentina, Brazil, and Peru: G. callosus, G. crassus, and G. standifer.

See also
 List of Linyphiidae species (A–H)

References

Araneomorphae genera
Linyphiidae
Spiders of South America